Pseudohemihyalea inexpectata is a moth in the family Erebidae. It was described by Hervé de Toulgoët in 1999. It is found in Sonora, Mexico.

References

Moths described in 1999
inexpectata